Pieter Holsteyn (1585–1662) was a Dutch Golden Age painter, engraver and stained glass worker.

Biography
Holsteyn was born and died in Haarlem.  According to Houbraken who quotes Samuel Ampzing,  "Pet. Holstein" was a good glasspainter who painted the damiaatjes in the Haarlem City Hall council chamber ("vroedschapskamer")". Unfortunately those stained glass windows have not survived, but in the 19th century four stained glass windows by Pieter Holsteyn were purchased from a church in Bloemendaal and restored, and those have been installed in the "Gravenzaal" or main hall of the city hall. One of them illustrates the Damiaatjes legend. Ironically, after restoration activities in the beginning of the last century, the Bloemendaal church wished to buy the windows back, but instead they have had replicas made.

According to the RKD, he taught his sons, Cornelis Holsteyn and Pieter Holsteyn the Younger. Besides his work on stained glass windows and engraved portraits, he is also known for insects, birds, and other animals. Since his son Pieter also took to painting birds, their works can be hard to tell apart.

References

Pieter Holsteyn on Artnet

1585 births
1662 deaths
Dutch Golden Age painters
Dutch male painters
Artists from Haarlem